Walter Kilger is a German former para table tennis player. He is a three-time European champion, World silver medalist and a Paralympic bronze medalist. He was member of the German paralympic tabletennis team at the Paralympics 2000 in Sydney, 2004 in Peking and 2008. and won 2 bronze medals. He was decorated by the President of the Federal Republic of Germany with the Silver Laurel Leaf, Germany's highest sport award.<ref>Sportbericht der Bundesregierung an den Bunbestag - Drucksache 14/96119 - Seite 51 ... seit 1992 werden auch die Medaillengewinner der Paralympischen Spiele mit dem Silbernen Lorbeerblatt ausgezeichnet ...<r/ef> (translation: since 1992 all the winners of medals at Paralympic Games were also decorated with the Silver Laural Leaf)

References

Living people
Paralympic table tennis players of Germany
Table tennis players at the 2000 Summer Paralympics
Recipients of the Silver Laurel Leaf
Table tennis players at the 2004 Summer Paralympics
Table tennis players at the 2008 Summer Paralympics
Medalists at the 2004 Summer Paralympics
Date of birth missing (living people)
Year of birth missing (living people)
German male table tennis players